Duke of Calabria was the traditional title of the heir apparent of the Kingdom of Naples after the accession of Robert of Naples. It was also adopted by the heads of certain Houses that had once claimed the Kingdom of Naples in lieu of the royal title.

There are at present two claimants to the title of Duke of Calabria. In the Spanish context, it is the title for the head of the House of Bourbon-Two Sicilies, and in the French context it is the title for the heir to the Duke of Castro, the head of the Royal House.

House of Anjou
 bef. 1297–1309: Robert, son of Charles II
 1309–1328: Charles, son of Robert
 1333–1343: Joanna, daughter of Charles, jointly with her husband Andrew of Hungary
 1343-1345: Andrew of Hungary, as husband of Queen Joanna I
 1345-1348: Charles Martel, son of Andrew and Joanna I
 1381–1382 Louis I of Naples
 1382–1384 Louis II of Naples
 1403–1417 Louis III of Naples
 1426–1434 Louis III of Naples

House of Lorraine
 1434–1435 René I of Naples
 1435–1470 John II, Duke of Lorraine
 1470–1473 Nicholas I, Duke of Lorraine
 1473–1481 Charles IV, Duke of Anjou
 1481–1493 René II, Duke of Lorraine
 1493–1544 Antoine, Duke of Lorraine
 1544–1545 Francis I, Duke of Lorraine
 1545–1608 Charles III, Duke of Lorraine
 1608–1624 Henry II, Duke of Lorraine
 1624 Francis II, Duke of Lorraine
 1624–1634 Charles IV, Duke of Lorraine
 1634–1661 Nicholas II, Duke of Lorraine
 1661–1675 Charles IV, Duke of Lorraine
 1675–1690 Charles V, Duke of Lorraine
 1690–1729 Leopold, Duke of Lorraine
 1729–1765 Francis I, Holy Roman Emperor
 1765–1790 Joseph II, Holy Roman Emperor
 1790–1804 Leopold II, Holy Roman Emperor

House of Aragon
 1458-1494 Alfonso II of Naples
 1494–1550 Ferdinand of Aragón
 1501–1504 Ferdinand II of Aragon

House of Bourbon-Two Sicilies

As royal title for the heir apparent to the throne:
 1747–1777 Infante Felipe (or Philip) (excluded from succession due to mental illness)
 1777-1778 Prince Carlo (died as an infant in 1778)
 1778-1825 Francis I of the Two Sicilies (title dropped on accession to the throne)
 1825-1830 Ferdinand II of the Two Sicilies (title dropped on accession to the throne)
 1836-1859 Francis II of the Two Sicilies (title dropped on accession to the throne)
 1894-1934 Prince Alfonso, Count of Caserta (he never used the title)

As customary title of the head of the House:
 1934-1960 Prince Ferdinando Pius

Spanish title claimants of the House of Bourbon-Two Sicilies
As customary title of the claimant to the headship of the House:
 1960-1964 Infante Alfonso
 1964-2015 Infante Carlos
 2015-present Prince Pedro

French title claimants of the House of Bourbon-Two Sicilies
As customary title for the heir of the claimant to the headship of the House:
 1973–2008 Prince Carlo (title dropped on succeeding his father as claimant to the headship)
 2016-present Princess Maria Carolina of Bourbon

See also
 List of monarchs of Sicily
 List of monarchs of Naples
 List of Counts and Dukes of Apulia and Calabria
 Scilla, Calabria
 Queen Paola of Belgium

References

External links
 

Calabria, Duke of
 
Calabria
Heirs to the throne